SH3 domain-binding glutamic acid-rich-like protein 3 is a protein that in humans is encoded by the SH3BGRL3 gene.

The 10.5kDa protein SH3 binding glutamic acid-rich protein-like 3 has an isoelectric point of 5.0. SH3 binding glutamic acid-rich (SH3BGR) gene is located to human chromosome 21. Two homologous genes, SH3BGRL and SH3BGRL3 are located to chromosome Xq13.3 and 1p34.3-35, respectively and code for small proteins similar to the N-terminal region of the SH3BGR protein. SH3BGRL3 protein shows a significant similarity to glutaredoxin 1 of E. coli, and all the three proteins are predicted to belong to thioredoxin-like protein family. Glutaredoxins (GRXs) are ubiquitous oxidoreductases, which catalyze the reduction of many intra-cellular protein disulfides and play an important role in many redox pathways. However, the SH3BGRL3 protein lacks the enzymatic function of glutaredoxins and may have a role as a regulator of redox activity.

Role in cancer 

Proteins such as glutaredoxin and thioredoxin are reported as up-regulated in many cancers such as lung and pancreatic; they have been implicated in increased resistance of cancer cells to free-radicals. There is little current evidence which directly links SH3GRPL3 with survival in cancer cells, however the protein has recently been identified as up-regulated in glioblastoma multiforme compared to normal cerebral tissue on proteomic analysis. Studies of acute promyelocytic leukemia cell line NB4 have also reported up-regulation of the protein. Conversely, the related protein SH3BGRL is reported to be downregulated in fibroblasts, lymphoid cells, and splenic tumor cells transformed by the viral oncogene v-Rel. Co-expression of SH3BGRL with v-Rel in primary splenic lymphocytes reduced the number of colonies formed by 76%.  Xu et al. reported SH3BGRPL3 protein as a post-translational modification of the 27kDa tumor necrosis factor alpha (TNF-α) inhibitory protein, TIP-B1. This protein is potentially involved in resistance of cells to the apoptosis-inducing effect of TNF-α.

References

Further reading